Terence Joseph "Terry" Gygar,  (born 21 October 1947), is an Australian academic and a former member of the Queensland Parliament. He is a former Army officer and served in Vietnam.

Gygar was the member for Stafford in the Queensland Parliament, representing the Liberal Party, from 1974 until 1983, and again from 1984 to 1989. During that time he held various shadow portfolios. During his time in parliament he was awarded the Chevening scholarship for study at the London School of Economics.

Following his Parliamentary service Gygar completed a Bachelor of Laws with Honours from Bond University. He is a barrister at the Supreme Court of Queensland, the High Court of Australia and the Federal Court of Australia. He has taught at Bond University since 1992 and is a foundation member of the Asia Pacific Law Deans' Association.

In recognition of his services to the Australian Defence Force, governance, education and the law, the Australian Government awarded Gygar the Australian Active Service Medal, General Service Medal for Vietnam, the Queen Elizabeth II Silver Jubilee Medal, the Australian Centenary Medal, the Reserve Force Decoration and the National Medal and Australian Defence Medal.

References

Living people
Members of the Queensland Legislative Assembly
Liberal Party of Australia members of the Parliament of Queensland
Bond University alumni
Academic staff of Bond University
1947 births